Natasha Doshi (born 2 August 1993) is an Indian actress and model who appears in Malayalam and Telugu films. She made her debut in 2012 with Manthrikan, directed by Anil Kumar.

Early life 
Born in Mumbai, Doshi began acting in childhood and is also a trained classical dancer.
. She was awarded Miss Talented in Miss Kerala 2010.

Career 
Her first appearance in film was in a documentary horror-comedy film called Manthrikan. In the same year, she played Gowri in a Malayalam film Hide n' Seek, loosely based on a South Korean romantic drama film 3-Iron. Although the films did not do well commercially, she was signed up for Call me @, a Malayalam film directed by Francis Thannikal and, later on, in Cappuccino, directed by Naushad, a Malayalam romantic comedy where she performs the lead role of Janaki. Doshi gained further recognition  for her casting by veteran director K. S. Ravikumar for his Telugu action drama film Jai Simha where she performed along with Nayanthara and Nandamuri Balakrishna.

Filmography

References

External links 

BookMyShow.com
Cinetrooth.in
IMDb.com

Actresses in Malayalam cinema
Actresses in Telugu cinema
Indian film actresses
Actresses from Mumbai
1993 births
Living people